Benjamin Albert Olney (30 March 1899 – 23 September 1943) was an English international footballer, who played as a goalkeeper.

Career
Born in Holborn, Olney played professionally for Aston Villa, and earned two caps for England in 1928.

References

1899 births
1943 deaths
English footballers
England international footballers
Aston Villa F.C. players
English Football League players
Association football goalkeepers